061502 is a live concert DVD of Botch's final show at The Showbox in Seattle. It contains two discs, one for the Concert DVD consisting of 14 songs with a bonus commentary, and a video for "Saint Matthew Returns To The Womb", and other bonuses. The second disc is a CD containing the audio version of the DVD. The set was released on vinyl in 2016.

Track listing

Credits
Ed Brooks (Mastering) 
Josh Graham (Editing) 
Josh Graham (Authoring)
Matt Bayles (Engineer) 
Matt Bayles (Mixing) 
Brian Cook (Liner Notes) 
Brian Cook (Group Member)
Ben Verellen (Guest Appearance) 
Dave Verellen (Group Member) 
Demian Johnston (Guest Appearance) 
John Pettibone (Vocals (Background))
John Pettibone (Lighting)
Andrew Gormley (Guest Appearance)
Shane Mehling (Guest Appearance)

References 

Botch (band) live albums
2006 video albums
Live video albums
2006 live albums
Hydra Head Records live albums
Hydra Head Records video albums
Botch (band) video albums